SexyPöxyt (which translates as "Sexy Pants") is a football club from Laaksolahti in Espoo, Finland. The club was formed in 1985 and currently plays in the Kolmonen, the fourth division of Finnish football, with their home ground based at the Laaksolahden urheilupuisto (Laaksolahti Sports Park).  The club chairman in 2012 is Pekka Huhta and the former chairmen are Lauri Walden, Jarkko Koskela, Jussi Vyyryläinen, Arto Nummivaara, Riku Auvinen, Petri Godenhjelm, and Timo Walden.

Background

According to its own description the club has become known for their home-made brown shirts in their early days and "spirit of the pants" which means confidence of the young players both in themselves and in their mates.

The club run a second team known as SuxiBoxit who a few years ago played in the Vitonen but now compete in the Over 35 age group. The team's home venue is at Karakallion Hornankattila (also known as Karakallion koulun kenttä).

Season to season

2010 season

For the 2010 season SexyPöxyt were competing in Section 1 (Lohko 1) of the Kolmonen administered by the Helsinki SPL and Uusimaa SPL.  This was the fourth highest tier in the Finnish football system. It was a significant season for the club as they were celebrating their 25th anniversary.

After promotion to the Second Division in 2011, SexyPöxyt had been forced to change their name to the tamer Pöxyt, so as not to fall foul of league rules restricting frivolous names at higher levels.

References and sources
 Club Website
Finnish Wikipedia
Suomen Cup
 SexyPöxyt Facebook

Football clubs in Finland
Sport in Espoo
1985 establishments in Finland